Hannibal Brooks is a 1969 British war comedy film directed by Michael Winner and written by Ian La Frenais and Dick Clement, based on a story by Winner and Tom Wright. It stars Oliver Reed, Michael J. Pollard and Wolfgang Preiss.

The film follows a prisoner of war's attempt to escape from Nazi Germany to Switzerland during the Second World War, accompanied by a female Asian elephant. The idea for the film was inspired by Tom Wright's diary from the war, when he was captured and spent nine months as a prisoner taking care of Asian elephants at the Munich zoo.  However, the escape and all following events of the film are fictional. The title alludes to the Carthaginian military commander Hannibal who led an army with war elephants over the Alps.

Plot
Lance corporal Stephen "Hannibal" Brooks is a British prisoner of war who is put to work in Munich zoo, looking after a female Asian elephant named Lucy. When the zoo is bombed by the Americans, the zoo director decides that the zoo is unsafe for the elephant. Brooks is sent along with hostile German soldier Kurt, a friendly German soldier named Willy and Vronia, a female cook to accompany the elephant to Innsbruck Zoo via a train.

They are forced to walk when Colonel von Haller, an SS officer tells Brooks that the elephant is not allowed on the train. In Austria, Kurt threatens to shoot Lucy while drunk and Brooks accidentally kills Kurt. Brooks, Lucy, Willy and Vronia are forced to run towards the Swiss border. They are helped along the way by an American escapee named Packy who has formed a group of partisans to fight the Germans in Austria, after many run-ins with the Nazis. Half-way there, Lucy gets mumps, so Brooks finds an Austrian doctor to look after her, while Vronia and Willy run to Willy's parents' house. Vronia and Willy are captured and are later joined by Brooks. Brooks and Willy are rescued by Packy and continue to race towards Switzerland with Lucy. Unfortunately, along the way Willy is shot by the Nazis while helping Brooks to escape.

When Brooks gets close to the border with Lucy, he is met by von Haller, who tells him to walk to Switzerland and Vronia, who has changed sides after being captured. Von Haller proposes the three go together to Switzerland as he intends to defect due to Germany's deteriorating military position. They are joined by Packy and his partisans near a German border post. The plan is to use von Haller to bluff their way through but he betrays them. Vronia tries to warn the others and is shot in the back. After another long fight with the Germans, Brooks and Lucy eventually get to Switzerland with Packy and his remaining partisans.

Cast
 Oliver Reed as Stephen 'Hannibal' Brooks
 Michael J. Pollard as Packy
 Wolfgang Preiss as Colonel von Haller
 Helmuth Lohner as Willi
 Peter Carsten as Kurt
 Karin Baal as Vronia
 Ralf Wolter as Dr. Mendel
 John Alderton as Bernard
  as Semi
 Ernst Fritz Fürbringer as Elephant keeper Kellerman
 Erik Jelde as Zoo director Stern
 James Donald as Padre
 Aida The Elephant as Lucy

Filming
Michael Winner had meant to make a film about William the Conqueror but been unable to raise finance. When that film fell through he had Hannibal Brooks ready to go. Michael J Pollard was paid $75,000 for his role. (He had received $14,000 for Bonnie and Clyde.) "Pollard will be a major star of the 70s," said Winner. Location shooting took place in Austria and Munich in May 1968.

Paperback novelization
Releasing it slightly in advance of the film (normal for the era), Lancer Books published a novelization of the screenplay, by Lou Cameron, a ubiquitous, notable and award-winning pulpsmith of the 60s through the 80s, among whose specialties was novels of men at war.

Reception
Vincent Canby of The New York Times wrote that the film "has a kind of slow, tranquilized dignity and a disarming desire to please. The extent to which it succeeds will depend largely on one's susceptibility to the old Sabu syndrome." Variety called the film a "pleasant, tame tale" in which Reed "carries the entire film on his admittedly broad shoulders but can't overcome the confused writing or the even greater burden of a poor performance by co-star, Michael J. Pollard. The latter, for some reason appearing as though he'd just completed a crash diet, is simply dreadful as a cocky Yank prisoner." Charles Champlin of the Los Angeles Times thought that the film seemed like "two or three story ideas (any one of which might conceivably have worked) interleaved into one big mish-mash which doesn't work ... Winner's direction is no help since he never really defines Reed's basic character." Clifford Terry of the Chicago Tribune called it "a preposterous, but pleasantly enjoyable film" with Reed giving "a solid, versatile performance, mixing humor and controlled anger." Gary Arnold of The Washington Post stated, "'Hannibal Brooks' should work. The technical problem is that Winner hasn't tried to draw us into the story at an easy, natural pace. He throws us into it, and almost every transition or change of scene is crudely bridged by a jump cut and a bad punch line." The Monthly Film Bulletin commented: "Hannibal Brooks suffers from a state of chronic uncertainty about just what sort of film it is trying to be. At some points all is elephant whimsy ... At others, Packy's guerrillas are in stern action, while Brooks lingers on the sidelines asking plaintively and pacifically 'what's it all for?' after the blowing up of a German convoy."

References

External links
 

1969 films
1960s war comedy-drama films
British war comedy-drama films
1960s English-language films
Films directed by Michael Winner
Films set in Austria
Films set in the Alps
Films set in Munich
Films about Nazi Germany
Films shot in Austria
Films shot in Munich
Military humor in film
World War II prisoner of war films
United Artists films
Films about elephants
Films scored by Francis Lai
Films with screenplays by Dick Clement
Films with screenplays by Ian La Frenais
1969 comedy films
1969 drama films
British World War II films
Films with screenplays by Michael Winner
Films produced by Michael Winner
1960s British films